"Bad to the Bone" is a 1982 song by George Thorogood and the Destroyers.

Bad to the Bone may also refer to:
 Bad to the Bone (George Thorogood & The Destroyers album), 1982
 Bad to the Bone, a 1986 album by LA Dream Team
 Bad to the Bone (Inner Circle album), 1992, or the title song
 "Bad to the Bone" (Running Wild song), 1989
 "Bad to the Bone" (Kool G Rap & DJ Polo song), 1990
 Bad to the Bone (film), a 1997 TV movie starring Kristy Swanson, David Chokachi and Jeremy London
 "Bad to the Bone" (CSI), a fourth-season episode of the television series CSI: Crime Scene Investigation
 Bad to the Bone (novel), a 2010 novel by Jeri Smith-Ready
 "Bad to the Bone", a song by Gotthard from the 2007 album Domino Effect